The Sri Lanka cricket team toured New Zealand from December 2018 to January 2019 to play two Tests, three One Day Internationals (ODIs) and one Twenty20 International (T20I) match. They also played a three-day warm-up match ahead of the Test series.

Sri Lanka Cricket recalled batsmen Lahiru Thirimanne and Sadeera Samarawickrama after a year out of the Sri Lankan team. Bowler Nuwan Pradeep  was also recalled to the team after previously being ruled out through injury.

New Zealand won the Test series 1–0, after the first match was drawn. It was their fourth consecutive series win, the first time they had achieved that in Test cricket. New Zealand won the ODI series 3–0. New Zealand scored the most runs by a team in a three-match bilateral ODI series. New Zealand's series aggregate of 1,054 runs are the most for any team in a three-match ODI series. They surpassed India's total of 1,053 runs in their home series against England in 2017. New Zealand also went on to win the one-off T20I match by 35 runs.

Squads

Angelo Mathews suffered an injury during the second Test and was later ruled out of Sri Lanka's squads for the limited overs fixtures, with Sadeera Samarawickrama replacing him. James Neesham suffered an injury during the third ODI and was replaced by Doug Bracewell in New Zealand's squad for the one-off T20I match.

Tour match

Three-day match: New Zealand XI vs Sri Lanka

Test series

1st Test

2nd Test

ODI series

1st ODI

2nd ODI

3rd ODI

T20I match

Only T20I

References

External links
 Series home at ESPN Cricinfo

2018 in New Zealand cricket
2018 in Sri Lankan cricket
International cricket competitions in 2018–19
Sri Lankan cricket tours of New Zealand